Graham Malcolm Wilson  (1917–1977) was a British physician, professor of medicine, and pioneer of clinical pharmacology.

Life

He was born in Edinburgh the son of Dr Malcolm Wilson, a lecturer in Mycology at Edinburgh University.

After education at Edinburgh Academy from 1923 to 1934, Graham Malcolm Wilson studied Medicine at the University of Edinburgh, graduating MB ChB in 1940, BSc in pathology in 1947, MD in 1950, and DSc in 1964. After graduation in 1940 he was appointed house surgeon and house physician at the Edinburgh Royal Infirmary. He qualified MRCPE in 1942.

During the Second World War he served in the RAF Medical Services from 1941 to 1946, being sent to North Africa in 1943. In 1946 he worked at the University of Edinburgh under A. Murray Drennan, professor of pathology. Wilson was from 1947 to 1949 an assistant physician under George White Pickering at the medical unit of St Mary's Hospital. At the University of Sheffield he was from 1950 to 1951 a lecturer, from 1951 to 1954 a senior lecturer, and from 1954 to 1967 a professor of pharmacology and therapeutics. During the academic year 1952–1953 he was on sabbatical as an Eli Lilly Research Fellow at Harvard Medical School.

From 1967 until his death in 1977 Wilson was regius professor of medicine at the University of Glasgow and also physician in charge of wards at the Western Infirmary.

Wilson was elected FRCPE in 1947 and FRCP in 1956, In 1969 he was elected a Fellow of the Royal Society of Edinburgh. His proposers were James Norman Davidson, Robert Campbell Garry, Martin Smellie and Anthony Elliot Ritchie.

He gave in 1962 the Bradshaw Lecture on Diuretics. He promoted research into the operation and efficiency of the National Health Service and created part-time medical posts specifically for women. He was chair of the editorial board of the British Journal of Clinical Pharmacology.

His home in Glasgow was in Westbourne Gardens in the Hyndland district. He also had a holiday cottage near Loch Sunart.

He died in Glasgow of a long and painful illness on 15 April 1977 a few hours before his 60th birthday.

Family
Graham Wilson's younger brother Cedric Wilson became a professor of pharmacology at Trinity College, Dublin.

In 1949 in Surrey, Graham married Elizabeth Stanfield Bell Nicoll (1926–2016), who was a physician and the daughter of the physician James Thomson Bell Nicoll (1900–1955). Graham and Elizabeth had seven children, two of whom became physicians and one of whom died in infancy.

Selected publications
with W. I. Baba and G. R. Tudhope: 

wit M. Green: 
with G. D. Broadhead and I. B. Pearson:

References

1917 births
1977 deaths
Medical doctors from Edinburgh
People educated at Edinburgh Academy
Alumni of the University of Edinburgh
Academics of the University of Sheffield
Academics of the University of Glasgow
20th-century British medical doctors
Fellows of the Royal College of Physicians
Fellows of the Royal College of Physicians of Edinburgh
Fellows of the Royal Society of Edinburgh
Royal Air Force Medical Service officers